The 2021 DFL-Supercup was the 12th edition of the German super cup under the name DFL-Supercup, an annual football match contested by the winners of the previous season's Bundesliga and DFB-Pokal competitions. The match was played on 17 August 2021.

The match featured Borussia Dortmund, the winners of the 2020–21 DFB-Pokal, and Bayern Munich, the champions of the 2020–21 Bundesliga. The match was hosted by Borussia Dortmund at the Signal Iduna Park in Dortmund.

Bayern Munich were the defending champions, having won the 2020 edition 3–2 against Borussia Dortmund. Bayern won the match 3–1 for their 9th DFL-Supercup title.

Teams
In the following table, matches until 1996 were in the DFB-Supercup era, since 2010 were in the DFL-Supercup era.

Background

Match

Summary
In the 41st minute, Serge Gnabry crossed from the left for Robert Lewandowski to put Bayern Munich ahead with a header from six yards out to the left of the net. Thomas Müller made it 2–0 in the 49th minute with a close range finish to the net after the ball had been played in from the left by Alphonso Davies and back-healed to him by Lewandowski. Marco Reus made it 2–1 in the 64th minute with a right foot finish from outside the penalty area to the top right corner of the net. Lewandowski scored his second in the 74th minute with a low finish to the right corner of the net from inside the penalty area after the ball broke to him after an error by Dortmund defender Manuel Akanji.

Details

See also
2020–21 Bundesliga
2020–21 DFB-Pokal

Notes

References

External links

2021
2021–22 in German football cups
Borussia Dortmund matches
FC Bayern Munich matches
Dfl-Supercup
Sports competitions in Dortmund
21st century in Dortmund